The 1987 British League season was the 53rd season of the top tier of speedway in the United Kingdom and the 23rd known as the British League.

Summary
Coventry Bees comfortably won the league finishing 16 points clear of Cradley Heath. The same five main riders who made up the 1986 team rode through the 1987 season but crucially four of them improved on their 1986 averages. Tommy Knudsen and Kelvin Tatum both hit over 10, while Rick Miller and David Bargh both improved by about 2 points on average. John Jørgensen also remained consistent for the Bees. Coventry also won the League Cup but lost to Cradley in the final of the Knockout Cup. The double defending champions Oxford Cheetahs were forced to release Simon Wigg to Hackney and Per Sorensen because of the 45 point limit. They finished second from bottom despite Hans Nielsen topping the averages once again.

Final table
M = Matches; W = Wins; D = Draws; L = Losses; Pts = Total Points

British League Knockout Cup
The 1987 Speedway Star British League Knockout Cup was the 49th edition of the Knockout Cup for tier one teams. Cradley Heath Heathens were the winners for the second successive year if including the tied 1986 final.

First round

Quarter-finals

Semi-finals

Final

First leg

Second leg

Cradley Heath were declared Knockout Cup Champions, winning on aggregate 94-86.

League Cup
The League Cup was contested as a league format. Coventry Bees won the final over two legs defeating Belle Vue Aces 84-72 on aggregrate. It was the last time that the competition was contested.

Qualifying table

Semi-finals

Final

Final replay

Leading final averages

Riders & final averages
Belle Vue

 8.92
 8.41
 8.38
	6.35
 5.82
 5.55
 3.92
 2.65

Bradford

 8.58
 8.47
 7.35
 7.31 
 5.73
 5.71
 4.97
 1.48

Coventry

 10.25 
 10.06 
 8.20
 7.80 
 7.46
 3.44
 2.58
 2.18
 2.13

Cradley Heath

 10.44
 9.60
 9.33 
 5.10
A 4.94
 3.94
 3.79
 3.47
 1.18

Hackney

 9.38 
 7.03
 6.10
 5.60
 5.40
 5.22
 5.20
 5.08

Ipswich

 9.67
 8.00 
 7.61
 6.39
 5.03
 4.58
 4.05
 3.97
 2.20

King's Lynn

 8.35
 6.67
 6.42
 6.25
 5.34
 5.27
 4.94
 4.93
 4.39

Oxford

 11.38
 8.53
 7.87
 5.68
 4.39
 3.72
 3.63
 3.04

Reading

 9.34
 8.99 
 6.95
 6.60
 6.45
 6.02
 2.57
 1.33

Sheffield

 9.47 
 9.23 
 7.59
 7.26
 5.50
 4.72
 3.88

Swindon

 9.61 
 9.36
 7.35
 6.73
 6.55
 6.37
 5.73
 1.54
 0.63

Wolverhampton

 9.86
 7.28
 6.33
 6.01
 5.48
 4.74
 3.20
 1.26
 0.40

See also
List of United Kingdom Speedway League Champions
Knockout Cup (speedway)

References

British League
1987 in British motorsport
1987 in speedway